The 2019 NCHC Tournament is the sixth tournament in league history. It was played between March 15 and 23, 2019. Quarterfinal were played at home team campus sites, while the final four games were played at the Xcel Energy Center in Saint Paul, Minnesota. By winning the tournament, Minnesota-Duluth received the NCHC's automatic bid to the 2019 NCAA Division I Men's Ice Hockey Tournament.

Format
The first round of the postseason tournament features a best-of-three games format. All eight conference teams participate in the tournament. Teams are seeded No. 1 through No. 8 according to their final conference standing, with a tiebreaker system used to seed teams with an identical number of points accumulated. The top four seeded teams each earn home ice and host one of the lower seeded teams.

The winners of the first round series advance to the Xcel Energy Center for the NCHC Frozen Faceoff. The Frozen Faceoff uses a single-elimination format. Teams are re-seeded No. 1 through No. 4 according to the final regular season conference standings.

Game 1 of the series between Western Michigan and Colorado College was delayed 1 day due to the effects from Winter Storm Ulmer.

Standings

Bracket
Teams are reseeded for the Semifinals

* denotes overtime periods

Results
All times are local.

Quarterfinals

(1) St. Cloud State  vs. (8) Miami

(2) Minnesota–Duluth vs. (7) Omaha

(3) Western Michigan  vs. (6) Colorado College

(4) Denver  vs. (5) North Dakota

Semifinals

(1) St. Cloud State vs. (6) Colorado College

(2) Minnesota–Duluth vs. (4) Denver

Third place

(4) Denver vs. (6) Colorado College

Championship

(1) St. Cloud State vs. (2) Minnesota–Duluth

Tournament awards

Frozen Faceoff All-Tournament Team
F Robby Jackson (St. Cloud State)
F Blake Lizotte (St. Cloud State)
F Patrick Newell (St. Cloud State)
D Jimmy Schuldt (St. Cloud State)
D Mikey Anderson (Minnesota–Duluth)
G Hunter Shepard* (Minnesota–Duluth)
* Most Valuable Player(s)

References

NCHC Men's Ice Hockey Tournament
2019
Ice hockey in Minnesota
College sports in Minnesota
2019 in sports in Minnesota
March 2019 sports events in the United States